Man with Fish is an outdoor fountain and sculpture by German artist Stephan Balkenhol, installed outside Chicago's Shedd Aquarium, in the U.S. state of Illinois.  It is made from bronze that was then painted, and is 16 feet tall.

See also

 List of public art in Chicago

References

Bronze sculptures in Illinois
Fish in art
Fountains in Illinois
Outdoor sculptures in Chicago
Sculptures of men in Illinois
Statues in Chicago
Colossal statues in the United States